2598 Merlin, provisional designation , is a carbonaceous Dorian asteroid from the central regions of the asteroid belt, approximately 16 kilometers in diameter. It was discovered on 7 September 1980, by American astronomer Edward Bowell at Lowell's Anderson Mesa Station in Flagstaff, Arizona, United States. The asteroid was named after the legendary wizard Merlin in Arthurian legend.

Classification and orbit 

Merlin is a member of the Dora family, a well-established central asteroid family of more than 1,200 carbonaceous asteroids. The family's namesake is 668 Dora. It is alternatively known as the "Zhongolovich family", named after its presumably largest member 1734 Zhongolovich. The Dora family may also contain a subfamily.

Merlin orbits the Sun in the central main-belt at a distance of 2.2–3.4 AU once every 4 years and 8 months (1,694 days). Its orbit has an eccentricity of 0.22 and an inclination of 8° with respect to the ecliptic. In Nombember 1948, the asteroid was first identified  at Uccle Observatory, where the body's observation arc begins 32 years prior to its official discovery observation at Anderson Mesa.

Physical characteristics 

In the SMASS classification, Merlin a Ch-type asteroid, a hydrated subtype of the broader carbonaceous C-complex.

According to the surveys carried out by the NEOWISE mission of NASA's Wide-field Infrared Survey Explorer, Merlin measures 15.694 kilometers in diameter and its surface has an albedo of 0.049.

Lightcurves 

As of 2017, no rotational lightcurve of Merlin has been obtained from photometric observations. The body's rotation period and shape remain unknown.

Naming 

This minor planet was named after the sage and sorcerer Merlin, featured mentor of King Arthur in Arthurian legend and medieval Welsh poetry. His magic enabled Arthur to pull Excalibur from the rock and become the rightwise king born of all England. The name was suggested by F. Pilcher. The approved naming citation was published by the Minor Planet Center on 4 August 1982.

Notes 

There is a book titled Merlin's Tour of the Universe, in which a fictitious character, called Merlin, answers all curious questions a layman would have about astronomy and the solar system. In the book, Merlin's favorite asteroid is Merlin 2598.

References

External links 
 Asteroid Lightcurve Database (LCDB), query form (info )
 Dictionary of Minor Planet Names, Google books
 Asteroids and comets rotation curves, CdR – Observatoire de Genève, Raoul Behrend
 Discovery Circumstances: Numbered Minor Planets (1)-(5000) – Minor Planet Center
 
 

002598
Discoveries by Edward L. G. Bowell
Named minor planets
002598
19800907